Dori Brenner (born Dori Levine; December 16, 1946 - September 16, 2000) was an American actress. She was born in Manhattan, and went to Sarah Lawrence College and the Yale School of Drama. Her oldest sister was award-winning author Ellen Levine. Her other sister, Mada Levine Liebman, was a senior advisor to US Senators Frank Lautenberg and Jon Corzine.

Brenner's first film was Summer Wishes, Winter Dreams. Some other films she appeared in were Altered States, For the Boys, and Next Stop, Greenwich Village. She also appeared on television, with series regular roles on The Charmings and Ned and Stacey as well in Seventh Avenue and in a recurring role as the neighbor on Who's the Boss? She also appeared in an episode of The Love Boat in 1978. She was a close friend of Bette Davis. She died of complications from cancer in Los Angeles, California.

Filmography

Award nominations

References

External links
 
 
 
 

1946 births
2000 deaths
American actresses
20th-century American women
20th-century American people
Burials at Beth David Cemetery